Sir Laurence Alfred Jones,  (18 January 1933 – 27 September 1995) was a senior Royal Air Force commander.

RAF career
Educated at Trinity School, Jones joined the Royal Air Force in 1951. He was made Officer Commanding No. 8 Squadron in 1961 and Officer Commanding No. 19 Squadron in 1967. He was appointed Station Commander at RAF Wittering in 1975 and Director of Operations (Air Support) in 1977 before becoming Senior Air Staff Officer at Headquarters RAF Strike Command in 1982. He then went on to be Assistant Chief of the Air Staff (Operations) in 1984, Assistant Chief of the Defence Staff (Programmes) in 1985 and Assistant Chief of the Air Staff in 1986 before being appointed Air Member for Personnel in 1987 and retiring in 1990.

In retirement he became Lieutenant Governor of the Isle of Man.

References

 

|-

 

1933 births
1995 deaths
Knights Commander of the Order of the Bath
Recipients of the Air Force Cross (United Kingdom)
Royal Air Force air marshals
Lieutenant Governors of the Isle of Man